Hawk Creek may refer to:

Hawk Creek (Bahamas), a stream in the Bahamas
Hawk Creek (Minnesota), a stream in Minnesota
Hawk Creek (Columbia River), a stream in Washington

See also
Hawk Creek Township, Renville County, Minnesota